The 2022 season was the London Spirit's second season of the 100 ball franchise cricket, The Hundred. The season was an improvement from the previous season, with the franchise reaching the knockout stages for the first time, and the men's side finishing third overall.

Players

Men's side 
 Bold denotes players with international caps.

Women's side 
 Bold denotes players with international caps.

Group fixtures

Fixtures (Men)

Fixtures (Women)
Due to the shortened women's competition, London Spirit didn't play against Manchester Originals.

Standings

Women

 advances to Final
 advances to the Eliminator

Men

 advances to Final
 advances to the Eliminator

Knockout stages

Men

Eliminator

References

The Hundred (cricket)
2022 in English cricket